Agustín Arriaga Rivera (20 August 1925 – 18 June 2006) was a Mexican economist and politician affiliated with the Institutional Revolutionary Party (PRI) who was governor of Michoacán from 1962 to 1968.

1925 births
2006 deaths
Institutional Revolutionary Party politicians
Governors of Michoacán
Politicians from Michoacán